Sara Bannerman is an Associate Professor at McMaster University's Department of Communication Studies and Multimedia. Bannerman is the Canada Research Chair in Communication Policy and Governance (Tier 2); she was first appointed in 2017, and renewed for a 2021 appointment.

Research 
Bannerman's research examines the power relationships between digital platforms and the state, especially privacy and platform regulation. In 2022, Bannerman received an Insight Grant from the Social Sciences and Humanities Research Council (SSHRC) for a project titled "Digital governance in Canada: Politics, players, and struggles for influence". Bannerman is a governing board member of the International Society for the Theory and History of Intellectual Property.

She holds a Bachelor of Music from Queen’s University, and an Master of Arts (2004) and a PhD (2009) in communication studies from Carleton University. Bannerman's dissertation was titled "Canada and the Berne Convention, 1886-1971".

Bannerman has published over 40 papers, which have been cited over 450 times.

Selected academic publications 
 Bannerman, Sara. Canadian Communication Policy And Law. Toronto: Canadian Scholars’ Press, 2020.
 Bannerman, Sara. The Struggle for Canadian Copyright: Imperialism to Internationalism, 1842-1971. UBC Press, 2013.
 Bannerman, Sara. International Copyright and Access to Knowledge. Cambridge University Press, 2016.
 Crowdfunding culture. S Bannerman. Journal of Mobile Media. 2013.
 Historical institutionalism in communication studies. S Bannerman and B Haggart. Communication Theory. 2015.
 Middle Powers and International Copyright History: the case of Canada. S Bannerman. Copyright Future Copyright Freedom. 2011.

References 

Canadian academics
Year of birth missing (living people)
Living people

Academic staff of McMaster University